The 1985 Mr. Olympia contest was an IFBB professional bodybuilding competition held on October 26, 1985, at the Forest National Theatre in Brussels, Belgium.

Results

Total prize money awarded was $100,000.

Notable events

Lee Haney won his second consecutive Mr. Olympia title

References

External links 
 Mr. Olympia

 1985
1985 in Belgian sport
1985 in bodybuilding
Bodybuilding competitions in Belgium
Sports competitions in Brussels
1980s in Brussels
October 1985 sports events in Europe